Justice Alladi Kuppuswami B.A., B.L. (1920-2012) was Chief Justice of Andhra Pradesh High Court.

He is son of Alladi Krishnaswamy Iyer and born on 23 March 1920. He was educated at Loyola College and Law College, Madras. He did B.A. (Hons.) Mathematics Degree in First Class in 1939 and studied Law in 1939–41. He worked as apprentice under late Sri V. Govindarajachari and enrolled as an Advocate in 1942. He was a member of the Andhra Pradesh Bar Council – 1961–67.

He died of cardiac arrest in Hyderabad, Andhra Pradesh on 12 March 2012.

References

Telugu people
1920 births
2012 deaths
Chief Justices of the Andhra Pradesh High Court
20th-century Indian judges
20th-century Indian lawyers